Capital Scandal (lit. "Scandal in Gyeongseong") is a 2007 South Korean television series starring Kang Ji-hwan, Han Ji-min, Ryu Jin, and Han Go-eun. It aired on KBS2 from June 6 to August 2, 2007 on Wednesdays and Thursdays at 21:55 for 16 episodes.

Based on Lee Sun-mi's novel  Love Story in the Capital, the story juxtaposes the heroic anti-Japanese movement with young romance by depicting the capital Seoul of the 1930s during colonial rule, at that time called "Gyeongseong" (hence its alternate title Scandal in Old Seoul). It was a time when the nation's independence fighters fought against pro-Japanese traitors, while traditional Joseon-era Confucian values clashed and coexisted with a more modern way of life. The series portrays one of the darkest periods of Korean history with a mixture of tragedy, comedy and romance.

Synopsis 
Sunwoo Wan (Kang Ji-hwan) is one of the capital's most notorious womanizers who alleges that he can seduce any woman within 10 minutes. The handsome, fashionable and rich young man doesn't have worries about the fate of his country. He gambles with his colleagues on his ability to seduce Na Yeo-kyung (Han Ji-min) whose nickname is "Jomaja" (the last woman of the Joseon Dynasty). She is known as a woman who doesn't care about her appearance and has no interest at all in dating. She runs a small bookstore while working as a volunteer teacher for poor children. Yeo-kyung is a very determined woman and has strong faith that her country will be liberated from Japan in the near future. Dating a guy or getting married is something she'll do only after the independence of her native land.

At first Wan doesn't take his bet seriously, but as events escalate in the capital, he finds himself falling in love with Yeo-kyung. She opens his eyes to the social injustices around him, which transforms him into becoming an independence movement activist himself. As Wan says, "Love is the strongest and most effective strategy for independence and revolution."

Cast

Main characters
 Kang Ji-hwan as Sunwoo Wan 
A thoroughly "modern boy," Sunwoo Wan  is always dressed fashionably in the latest trends and likes jazz, gambling and women. He frequents the night clubs and has his face splashed on the tabloids. The most famous playboy in Gyeongseong, Wan is confident that it takes him only ten minutes to seduce a girl. One day he makes a bet that he will break his record by seducing not some pretty and sophisticated girl, but the prudish independence fighter nicknamed Jomaja. But what begins as false love later evolves into genuine feelings. He experiences real love for the first time, which later evolves into patriotism. The former hedonist turns into an enthusiastic independence fighter.

 Han Ji-min as Na Yeo-kyung
 Unlike most young women of the era, Yeo-kyung has received an advanced education but still prioritizes pre-modern moral values. She still wears a traditional white blouse and a black skirt. She is strong-willed and stubborn -- to the extent that she makes others want to challenge her. Many young men have tried to approach her but failed. Rumor has it that she scolded on man for a full hour for daring to ask her out. That's why Gyeongseong guys have given up on her; they just sarcastically and disparagingly call her Jomaja, meaning "the last woman of Joseon."

Ryu Jin as Lee Soo-hyun
 Having received an elite education in Tokyo, Soo-hyun has outstanding work abilities, good manners and neat looks, and he is quickly climbing up the promotion ladder at the Japanese government in Korea. Everybody knows that Japanese high-ranking official Ueda Mamoru fully trusts and relies on him. But as talented as he is, Soo-hyun also has many enemies, including his Japanese coworkers, Korean underlings and even his childhood friend Sunwoo Wan. He merely ignores people who accuse him of betraying his country. His face is always expressionless and doesn't betray his secrets, and he only smiles briefly at decisive moments.

Han Go-eun as Cha Song-joo
 A famous gisaeng, Song-joo has spellbinding looks that can charm anyone, and enviable skills at dancing and singing. Only men of high social status can meet with her. Those who don't have enough money or power to meet with her in person can hear her songs on Gyeongseong Radio or see her smiling face on Japanese government PR posters hanging at the train station. Song-joo is the top celebrity of the era when there were no entertainers in Joseon yet.

Supporting characters
 Kang Nam-gil as Kim Tak-goo
 Lee Kyung-jin as Choi Hak-hee
 Ahn Yong-joon as Kang In-ho
 Yoon Gi-won as Lee Kang-goo
 Ahn Suk-hwan as Ueda Mamoru 
 Choi Phillip as Yamashita Kouji
 Kim Hye-ok as Ueda Sachiko 
 Park Ha-sun as So Young-rang
 Yoon Joo-sang as Sunwoo Kwan
 Yoon Ye-hee as Heo Young-hwa
 Heo Jeong-min as Shin Se-ki
 Go Myung-hwan as Wang Gol
 Jang Tae-sung as Chu Geun-deok
 Seo Hyun-ki as Mang-chi
 Uhm Hyun-kyung as Ueda Miyuki
 Choi Yeo-jin (cameo, ep 1)

Original soundtrack 
 Gyeongseong Scandal - Eru
 Because of you - Jeon So-young
 Elegy
 Dance with me
 You who believe this is the end - Jay
 No Life Without You (feat. Soseol)
 Winds of Gyeongseong
 Gyeongseong Scandal (Inst.)
 Sweet Song - Noh Jin-young
 Gyeongseong BLUES
 Mong (dream)
 Waltz of Destiny
 Elegy Tango
 You who believe this is the end (Inst.)
 One Summer
 Because of you (Inst.)
 In a Mood

Awards and nominations

References

External links 
 Capital Scandal official KBS website 
 Capital Scandal Fan Cafe at Daum 
 
 

Korean Broadcasting System television dramas
2007 South Korean television series debuts
2007 South Korean television series endings
Anti-Japanese sentiment in Korea
South Korean historical television series
Television shows based on South Korean novels
Television series by JS Pictures
Television series set in Korea under Japanese rule